Laumonttoceras is a genus in oncocerid family Jovellaniidae from the lower Devonian of Europe characterized by uncompressed, moderately expanding, orthocones with a central siphuncle composed of cylindrical segments that are slightly contracted at the septal openings and which contain discrete, discontinuous actinosphonate deposits.

Laumontoceras differs from Jovellania, also from the lower Devonian of Europe, primarily in having a central rather than a subventral siphuncle, as in Jovellania.

References
Sweet, W. C. 1964. Nautiloidea- Orthocerida. Treatise on Invertebrate Paleontology, Part K. Geol Soc of America and Univ of Kansas Press. Teichert & Moore, (eds)

Prehistoric nautiloid genera
Oncocerida